José Joaquín Berrios Corvalán  (born November 6, 1967, in Santiago, Chile), is a Chilean–American musician, composer, singer, guitar player, piano player and record producer. His career expand more than three decades starting with the local underground rock scene in Chile during the second half of the nineteen eighties to this day with his work as a solo artist. He also was a member of "Sofia", a band formed in Boston MA that was part of the Rock en Español scene in Miami FL by the end of the nineteen nineties. In 2008 he founded KZK Records, and independent label to promote and develop local talent.

Career
He grew up in Santiago, Chile and flew the country in 1992 to study composition at Berklee College of Music in Boston. He graduated in 1995 Cum Laude with a bachelor's degree in film scoring, and received his Diploma from honorary degree recipients James Taylor and Natalie Cole. In Boston, he formed the alternative Spanish Rock band, Sofia, with Mexican guitarist Joshua Sonntag, bassist Rafols Morales and drummer Raul Ramirez, both from Puerto Rico. After signing with New York-based record label Big Sur Music, they recorded their debut album, Sofia. Produced by Chilean record producer Alvaro Riveros, tracked at Ochoa Studios in Puerto Rico, mixed at The Hit Factory in New York and mastered by Howie Weinberg also in New York. Though this album was never released or distributed, Big Sur Records produced a video for "Tres Palabras", a medley with sections from Osvaldo Farrés original "Tres Palabras" and "Amar y Vivir" for Consuelo Velazquez.  The video got medium to heavy rotation in MTV Latino and in The Box.
 
The whole band moved to Miami, Florida in 1997 where they played and toured extensively in Florida, Cancun and Guadalajara Mexico for three years before dissolving in 2000.

Berrios moved back to Chile where he wrote, performed and produced his first solo career album SOLO. SOLO, is a conceptual work with some progressive rock tints, and influences from Pink Floyd. The album was distributed in Chile by Big Sur Records, now based there, where it was favorably received by the alternative and progressive music community.

The same year, Berrios composed, thru a series of improvisations, Ancestros Piano Music Vol. 1. The album made of 13 tracks was dedicated to all of his grandparents: Haydee Rigazzi, Adolfo Berrios, Hernan Corvalan and Isabel Montenegro.

He came back to Miami, Florida, in 2001, where he formed the band, La Flotabanda, with friends from the local band Tereso; Juan Manuel Rozas on lead guitar and Alejo Rozas on drums, and with Gaston Zukowski from the band The Gardy's on bass. He produced and recorded with former bandmate Rafols Morales, their eponymous album La Flotabanda at Yellow Wings Studios in Miami.

In 2008, Berrios and his wife Micaela Rozas established KZK RECORDS LLC, a record label, web design, music production and audio post company. At KZK's recording studio, Berrios produced local artist such as Eric Wagner and Tremends Sofia who recorded their second album, Embrujo, with a series of songs that used to conform the live set list of the Band at the end of the nineties, and "Perro Grande" with school mates Rafols Morales in bass and Rolando Gonzales in Drums. A collection of Rock Songs arranged with layers of electric guitar performed by Berrios
In 2016, after a long musical hiatus, he created In the Garden of Eve, a ten-song album with brass and woodwind arrangements. Drums were performed by Phoenix Rivera, saxophone by Michael Sinisgalli, and lead/back female vocals by Joana Hughes Cooper. Berrios wrote, produced, arranged, performed (guitars, bass, piano and vocals), recorded and mixed the album. In the Garden of Eve was mastered by Brian Lucey at Magic Garden Mastering Studios.
The video for the first single "Crash", was recorded at America filmworks in Miami. It features Argentinian dancer, Andrea Leggieri and singer Joana Hughes.

In 2017 Berrios compose an album inspired in the political events that took over life in the United States of America that Year. A collection of songs intertwined forming a conceptual album that explores the composer's perception of the different topics dominating the American discourse at that time, from immigration, to racism, to war, to climate change. The Album was named "2017 The Year of the Bully" and was released in August 2018. Again, Berrios had musicians Phoenix Rivera on drums, Michael Sinisgalli on tenor Sax and Joana Huges Cooper on Vocals. Bass, Guitars, Piano and lead Vocals were performed by the Author as well as the recording, mixing and mastering stages of the project too.

In 2019 Berrios composed "Requiem for Utopia". The author was inspired by the social unrest going on in America with president Trump's first impeachment and more specifically by the events happening in his native Chile. This album is also a conceptual one, but this time manly based on piano music. The tracking stage was done at the beginning of the COVID-19 pandemic, limiting the range of instruments and performers involved for safety reasons.

Berrios recorded, mixed and master the album and played all instruments except Drums, that one more time, were performed by New York drummer Phoenix Rivera. The album was released in May 2020.

The same year, Berrios release "Rotten apples from the garden of Eve". Due to the stay at home orders and social distancing imposed by the fight against the pandemic, Berrios decided to revisit a series of songs coming from the "In the Garden of eve" recordings that didn't make the cut and release them as a new Album.

Early life
Berrios is the oldest brother of Pablo Antonio Berrios Corvalán; an architect and web programmer who lives in Barcelona, Spain. They were both born in Santiago de Chile, 1967 and 1969 respectively from Jose Joaquin Berrios Rigazzi and Ana Maria Corvalan Montenegro. Both parents are economists. While their father Joaquin, who worked for a long time for LAN Chile to later focus on the private sector, Mother Ana, worked in education, for both the chilean government and UNESCO.

Both children were raised Roman Catholic and went to SSCC Manquehue from kindergarten to high school. However, Berrios never went through the process of confirmation and openly disliked what he considered to be an opulent lifestyle of the Vatican, while professing the word of Christ to the poor. His views on the matter, can clearly be heard in the lyrics for the song "Bubble" in his album SOLO. His first connection with music was probably through his mother singing. She was a usual performer on family reunions singing traditional Chilean folk songs. Since early childhood, there was a piano in his home, the same piano where his mother Ana and her sister Gloria, learned in their family home as children in Talca Chile. Also, his father Joaquin, used to improvise on the instrument in the afternoons after work, when the whole family was reunited at home, This was fuel in the search for improvisational skills in his eldest son.

In 1985, Berrios grabbed the Spanish guitar and influenced by Cuban singer-Songwriter Silvio Rodriguez one of the founders of the "Cuban nueva trova" commenced writing his firsts songs inspired by sociopolitical themes. Not long after that and while listening to the then upcoming bands Metallica and Slayer, together with childhood friends formed the band "Track", where he was the lead singer. A heavy metal act, performing in the few places available during Pinochet's dictatorship. Venues of the underground Rock scene like "Sammy's Shop" and the now also gone  "Manuel Plaza" Gym in Nuñoa's Plaza egaña.

Soon after, the band morphed into Rapsodia, a more pop oriented group where Berrios played the lead guitar. The band gained airplay in the north of Chile with the song "Desierto" and made a video for Universidad de Chile television; nowadays called Chilevision. Then the band morphed again in 1987 to a trio named Vos, getting airplay and TV appearances with the song "Take Me Home". During Pinochet's dictatorship's decades, the number of music school were very limited, almost non-existent. Berrios started to study with Roberto Lecaros, one of the few musicians and educators that did not leave the country against all odds and political repression. He also was in 1990 part of the first generation of students under the conduction of Maestro Guillermo Rifo in "La escuela Moderna de Musica".

In 1988, Berrios suffered a car accident in the town of Constitucion where nobody got hurt, but changed his life. He decided to redeem himself through the study of piano and leave behind all social life. He grabbed "The Virtuoso Pianist in 60 Exercises" method and played regularly six hours every day of technique for two years. After the daily dose of exercises he began writing music that formed the basis for his first complete work, "Big Bang... Boom". By the end of 1991 he recorded this conceptual 14 minutes piece at "Sala Master" Universidad de Chile studios, and used it to apply for a scholarship and acceptance in to Berklee College of Music.

Personal life
Berrios is married to Micaela Rozas, daughter of Eduardo Rozas, a television and film producer and actress, Coni Vera. Micaela is an artist and designer born in Buenos Aires, Argentina. They first met in "La Kaza Zirkuz" in 1998. Micaela is the younger sister of Juan Manuel Rozas and Alejo Rozas, both members of the Band Tereso at the time, and Tremends as of today. Though they met in 1998, they only became a couple in 2001 when both returned to Miami, Florida.  Micaela was travelling through US and Mexico and Joaquin was in Chile recording SOLO. They married in 2007, after living together for six years. The ceremony was officiated by friend, brother and brother in law, Juan Manuel Rozas in Miami FL 2007. They have been together ever since and have two daughters, Matilda Chloe (born in 2008) and Roma Belle (born in 2014).

Kaza Zirkuz
La Kaza Zirkuz, was an spontaneous reunion of local artists in Miami Beach in 1998. Under the same roof were reunited musicians, film makers, painters and sculptors. The basis for such a reunion, were the bands, Sofia and Tereso. Both rock acts populated the alternative local scene playing many days a week in local bars Roses, South Beach Pub, Churchill's pub and Tobacco Road among many others.
Their friends, mostly artists from Argentina, Cuba and Chile, were united in a year of communion, creation and daily "asados".

Discography
Big Bang... Boom (1991)
Sofia (1997)
Sofia Live SB Pub (1998)
Solo (2001)
Ancestros_Piano Music Vol. 1 (2001)
Flotabanda (2001)
Perro Grande (2006)
Sofia Embrujo (2008)
Sofia live at KZK (2008)
In the Garden of Eve (2016)
2017 The Year of The Bully (2018)
Requiem for Utopia (2020)
Rotten Apples from the Graden of Eve (2020)

References

1967 births
Living people
American male composers
20th-century American composers
American male singers
American male guitarists
20th-century American guitarists
American male pianists
20th-century American pianists
21st-century American pianists
20th-century American male musicians
21st-century American male musicians